The  is a DC electric multiple unit (EMU) commuter train type introduced in 1985 by Japanese National Railways (JNR), and inherited by JR East and JR West after the privatization two years later. It is currently operated by East Japan Railway Company (JR East), West Japan Railway Company (JR West), and KAI Commuter in Indonesia.

Operations
JR East (in alphabetical order)
 Nambu Branch Line: 2-car 205–1000 series sets (x3) (from 2002) (rebuilt by JR East from former 205–0 series sets)
 Senseki Line: 4-car 205–3100 series sets (from 2004) (rebuilt by JR East from former 205–0 series sets with passenger-operated door controls, toilets, and passenger seating which can be arranged in either transverse or longitudinal)
 Tsurumi Line: 3-car 205–1100 series sets (x9) (from 25 August 2004) (rebuilt from former 205-0 sets)

JR West (in alphabetical order)
 Nara Line: 4-car JR West 205-0 and 205–1000 series sets (transferred from Hanwa line services)

KAI Commuter (in alphabetical order)
 Duri-Tangerang Line:8/12-car 205 series sets since 2018.
 Jakarta Kota-Bogor Line: 8-car, 10-car (since 2014) and 12-car (since 2015) 205 series sets.
 Cikarang Loop Line: 8-car (since 2014), 10-car (since 2015), and 12-car (since 2015) 205 series sets.
 Rangkasbitung Line: 10-car (since 2016) 205 series sets

Former operations

 Chuo-Sobu Line: 10-car 205–0 series sets (from 1989 until 2001)
 Hachikō Line: 4-car 205–3000 series sets (x5) (from 2003 until 15 July 2018) (former 205-0 sets modified by JR-East to form shorter trainsets for use in outer suburban services) (have passenger-operated door controls)
 Hanwa Line: 4-car 205-1000 (built by JR-West) series sets (from 1988), 6- and 8-car 205–0 series sets (from 2006 until 2010; March 2013 until 16 March 2018) (formerly operated on JR-West Tokaido-Sanyo Local services as 7-car sets)
 Kawagoe Line: 4-car 205–3000 series sets (x5) (from 2003 until 15 July 2018) (rebuilt by JR East from former 205–0 series sets, with passenger-operated door controls) / 10-car 205–0 series sets (from July 1989 until October 2016)
 Keihin-Tohoku Line: 10-car 205–0 series sets (from 1989 until 1996)
 Keiyō Line: 10-car 205–0 series sets (from 1990 until 2011)
 Musashino Line: 8-car 205–5000 series sets (x36) and 8-car 205–0 series sets (x6) (from 1991 until October 2019 (205-0 series sets) and from 2002 until October 2020 (205-5000 series sets))
 Nambu Line: 6-car 205-0 (x31) (including 4 sets with 205-1200 driving trailers which were converted from 205–0 series intermediate trailers) (from 1989 until 9 January 2016)
 Nikkō Line: Refurbished 4-car 205–600 series sets with toilets (x4) (from March 2013 until 11 March 2022)
 Sagami Line: 4-car 205–500 series sets (x13) (from 1991 until February 2022)
 Saikyo Line: 10-car 205–0 series set (from July 1989 until October 2016) (through service to Rinkai Line)
 Tokaido-Sanyō Local service (Biwako, Kyoto, Kobe, Fukuchiyama lines): 7-car 205–0 series sets (from 1986 until 2006)
 Tokaido Local Service (Kyoto, Kobe lines): 7-car 205–0 series sets (from 2011 until March 2013) (formerly operated on JR-West Hanwa Line as 6- and 8-car sets)
 Utsunomiya Line: Refurbished 4-car sets with toilets (x8) (from March 2013 until 11 March 2022)
 Yamanote Line: 11-car 205–0 series sets (from 1985 until 2005) (initially 10-car sets)
 Yokohama Line: 8-car 205–0 series sets (x28) (from 1988 until 23 August 2014, initially 7-car sets)
 Yogyakarta Line: 4/8-car (from 2021 to 2022) 205 series sets

Design variants 
There have been many variations of the design of the 205 series trains.
 205-0 series: 6, 7, and 8-car sets used on the JR West Tokaido Line, and Hanwa Line. 6, 7, 8, 10, and 11-car sets used on the JR East Chuo-Sobu Line, Keihin-Tohoku Line, Keiyo Line, Nambu Line, Musashino Line, Saikyo Line, Yamanote Line, and Yokohama Line.
 205-500 series: 4-car sets used on the Sagami Line
 205-600 series: 4-car sets for use on the Nikko Line and Utsunomiya Line from 16 March 2013
 205-1000 series: 4-car JR-West sets that formerly ran on Hanwa Line. Currently runs on Nara Line.
 205-1000 series: 2-car JR East sets rebuilt from former 205–0 series cars, used on the Nambu Branch Line
 205-1100 series: 3-car sets rebuilt from former 205–0 series cars, introduced on the Tsurumi Line from 25 August 2004
 205-1200 series: 6-car sets rebuilt from former 205–0 series cars, used on the Nambu Line
 205-3000 series: 4-car sets rebuilt from former 205–0 series cars, used on the Kawagoe Line and Hachiko Line
 205-3100 series: 4-car sets rebuilt from former 205–0 series cars, used on the Senseki Line
 205-5000 series: Former Yamanote Line 205–0 series cars modified with new IGBT-VVVF-controlled AC motors between 2002 and 2008, used on the Musashino Line

205-0 series 

The 205 series was designed in 1982 as a cheap-to-produce train that could complement the 201 series sets which were considered to be expensive to produce due to the latter's thyristor chopper-controlled traction systems. The first set entered service on the Yamanote Line on 1985, and has remained a staple of the JR fleet network ever since. It was originally built with the low-end resistor-controlled traction systems, as they were cheaper to produce than the typical thyristor chopper-controlled motors or something similar to that, but this was somewhat dated technology due to the advent of the high-end variable frequency drive which had just started being used around this time. It uses a traditional design with an unpainted stainless steel body very much like most trains of the period. Each set has a different color scheme to indicate which area the sets serve.

The 205 series is currently used on both JR East and JR West lines, and the 205–0 series will be finally ending operation in JR East on 2020. Filling their retirement from JR, 524 205–0 series vehicles have been shipped to Jakarta, Indonesia from 2013 to 2020 to continue their operation overseas replacing aging commuter trains and mass improvement of public transportation in Greater Jakarta by train, while there are still 205–0 series operational in JR West lines.

It was manufactured from 1984 to 1991 and initially built 10-car trainsets for test-run conducted in 1984 for JNR Yamanote Line. It was manufactured by Tokyu Car Corporation, Hitachi for technical components, Nippon Sharyo, Kinki Sharyo, and Kawasaki Heavy Industries. The basic structure is similar to that of the subsequently manufactured vehicles like the 201 series & the 203 series, but the difference is that the window shape is a two-pane window panels with the upper stage descending and the lower stage rising. All four manufacturers were introduced to the Yamanote line in March 1985, and in 1991, like the other trains, the Saha 204-0 was introduced as a 6-door intermediate carriage for Yamanote Line to be assigned as new Car No. 10 to be coupled and form 11-car Yamanote Line trainsets from December 1991.

In 2005, the Saha 204 intermediate carriages, were also transferred to the Saikyo line upon retirement from Yamanote Line, and also some of the existing Yamanote Line 205 series were transferred to the Keiyo line to continue their train operation until they ended on 2011. The trip number indicator of each leading car was initially introduced as a traditional roller-binding display as commonly used by other JNR rolling stocks, but in 1985, it was newly installed for the first time with the LCD type trip number indicator display and also later replaced along with the 0-subseries mass-produced vehicles.

JR East 205–0 series gallery

JR West 205–0 series gallery

6 door cars 

JR East uses cars with six doors on each side to cope with rush hour congestion., 1990. The cars have folding seats to increase the number of standing spaces, increasing capacity in the morning when the busiest time is reached. The seats can be locked automatically by the train driver. The time when seats are available varies depending on the line section. On the Yamanote Line, Saikyo Line, and Rinkai Line, they are unlocked at 10:00. On the Yokohama Line the seats are unlocked at 9:00. In the same line area, the conductor unlocks at the same time. When the lock is released, a lamp installed at the end of the seat is turned on, and passengers can manually pull the seats out to use them (this is a manual type for safety). As for storage, it is automatically stored (using springs and gas dampers) at the push of a button after entering the depot without passengers. There is a sticker inside the car to indicate that you cannot use your seat until the cancellation time. Therefore, depending on the train, there were those that could be used near the unloading station and those that had seats that passengers did not pull out. Also, to prevent tampering, the seat once pulled out by the passenger, is locked and cannot be manually stored.

The body uses a panel structure developed by Kinki Vehicle to reduce costs and improve performance. This is a panel made of a reinforcing material called dimple board. This is also for the purpose of improving the physique of modern people and reducing the feeling of pressure in the car during rush hours. In addition to the panel-type structure, the gas damper-type balancer mechanism unit-type descending window to the side window and the customer door using Honeycomb structure have been a motivation to incorporate the technologies unique to Kinki Sharyo vehicles.

Unlike the conventional conical laminated rubber type, the bogie uses the roll rubber type axle box support type TR241B adopted in 651 series. In addition, the towing device has been changed from the link type to the Z link type (this cart system is only in the 900s and 0s).

Due to the structure of the seat, the heating device cannot be installed under the seat as in the past, so floor heating, which is rarely used in railway cars, is adopted. In addition, a small sheathed heater is installed under the seat as before. This is an ancillary, the heater only works when the seat is occupied.

The air conditioner uses the AU717 type (50,000 kcal/h・58.0 kW), which has a capacity of about 20% compared to the conventional model because the door opening is large. The control method is an inverter method that uses 600 V DC as the power source (conventionally, an operation rate control method that uses a three-phase AC source. The 100 series will be described later). On the ceiling, auxiliary blowers (line delia) are added from 4 to 6, and circulator is installed at the top of each door (12 places).

In the car, the number of grab handles has been significantly increased from 98 (4 door intermediate car before expansion) to 150, and 5 stanchion poles with a protector wound in the central passageway. The installed position is not in the center of the former entrance plaza, but in front (between) of the storage seats. It was installed because the seats were retractable and there was no place to grab near the door. Since there are six doors in the car, the number of seats is 30, which is less than the number of ordinary 4-door vehicles (54 seats). In addition, due to the peculiarity of the auxiliary seat that cannot be used due to the above time period, the 205 series does not have a priority seat. On the other hand, it is compatible with barrier-free by installing wheelchair space here by utilizing the end of the vehicle.

The emergency door opener of each door is installed on the top of the door covered with glass, and the 0.900 series says "How to use, you can open the door by pulling the handle in this glass toward you" It is written as ".", but since the 100s are in the same style as 209 series, "The door can be opened by hand by pulling the handle inside." Has been done.

In Yamanote Line cars, an information service using an in-vehicle display monitor has been started on a trial basis. This is intended for JR East to provide information in a timely manner in consideration of improving passenger services.

As for the in-vehicle display monitor, the Saha 204-901 uses a 5-inch liquid crystal display, and the Saha 204-902 uses a 6-inch CRT type thin display, which is located above each door. There were 12 inspection lids on each side, 12 on each side, and 24 were installed for each. Broadcast contents include news, weather forecast, commercials by text broadcasting, PR information of JR East and environmental videos including sports information. It is something to flush. This is officially adopted in mass-produced vehicles. There is a receiving antenna in the ventilator on the roof, a tuner, a controller for control,, and these are displayed on the in-vehicle monitor via these.

After that, since there is no support equipment for information provision equipment other than the same line, when E231-500 series was introduced, when Saikyo Line or Yokohama Line the liquid crystal display and the receiving antenna were removed. Only this vehicle did not have a destination indicator, but the Saikyo Line transfer car has some windows modified and installed with LED type.

As mentioned above, with the replacement of the E231 series 500 series, operation on the Yamanote line ended on April 17, 2005, and 900 series 2 out of 2 900 series and 51 0 series operated on the same line From 2001 to 2008, both cars and 0-series cars were converted to at the Kawagoe Rolling Stock Center and operated on the Saikyo Line and Rinkai Line, and the remaining one was in 2003 in Kamakura. It was converted to the general rolling stock depot (currently Kamakura Rolling Stock Center) and operated with the 100 series newly placed on the same line on the Yokohama Line, but with the replacement of the E233-6000 series and -7000 series. As of February 2014, operations on the Saikyo and Rinkai lines and on the Yokohama Line have ended on August 23 of the same year.

Saha 204 type 900 series 
On 27 February 1990 a new 6-door prototype car was produced, and two of which were manufactured. The 900 series (901/902) has been added, making it the only prototype car series division in this series. Originally located in the Yamate Electric Railway ward (currently Tokyo General Rolling Stock Center), it was connected to No. 9 and No. 2 cars of set Yate 42 (10 cars less than Kuha 205–42) in the same year March 10 it commenced commercial operation after the timetable revision. It is also being implemented to change the connecting position to cars 8 and 9 for testing the congestion situation.

The size of the monitor screen in the car is different from that of the mass-produced car. In addition, there is a selective opening/closing function during quiet times (all 6 doors open/select only 4 out of 6 doors open), and the deadline is 2 open doors (2nd and 5th doors) The lamps that indicate were installed on both sides of the door outside the vehicle and next to the emergency door cock above the interior door. In addition, the shape of the luggage rack is a pipe type similar to the 100s, which is slightly higher than the mass-produced vehicle (height ). Other facilities are the same as the mass-produced cars.

After various tests, mass production modification was installed from October to November 1990 when the mass production car was not completed, and the monitor screen inside the car was changed to the same 9-inch liquid crystal display as the mass production car. Replacement, removal of selective opening and closing functions, installation of auxiliary power supply device for own vehicle (described in the next 0 series), etc. are being implemented.

Even after the 0's were connected, the two prototype cars were divided into one and connected (901 connected to set Yate 42, 902 connected to set Yate 60), and the connection formation was replaced several times. On 5 February 1996, with the addition of set Yate 42 when it moved to the Kawagoe train area (current Kawagoe rolling stock center), the 902 that was incorporated into the set Yate 49 at that time was discontinued. It was replaced with Saha 204–42 in the 0s, which had been treated, and then 902 became a reserved car.

After that, the 902 was reassigned for the Saikyo Line from 30 June 2001, and the 901 was relocated to the same location from 5 December 2003. After being transferred to the Saikyo Line, 902 was incorporated into 8 flies and 901 was incorporated into 18 flies, and they were running on the same line.

205-500 series

The 205-500 series 4-car sets were introduced into service by JR East on the Sagami Line in 1991, when the line was fully electrified. These sets featured a number of design changes over the original 205 series, such as passenger-operable doors as well as a revamped front-end design. Following the introduction of the newer E131-500 series trains, all sets were withdrawn from service by February 2022.

205-600 series

The 205-600 subseries was created in 2013, when cars from former Keiyo Line and Saikyo Line ten-car sets were reformed between 2012 and 2013 to create twelve four-car sets for use on Nikko Line and Utsunomiya Line services, entering service from 16 March 2013, replacing the ageing 107 series and 211 series sets. The four Nikko Line sets are finished in a livery with "classic ruby brown", "gold", and "cream" bodyside stripes. The Utsunomiya Line sets are finished in a livery with Shonan green and orange bodyside stripes. Their services ended on 11 March 2022 ahead of the introduction of newer E131-600 series trainsets.

Formations
The four-car sets, numbered Y1 to Y12, were formed as shown below, with two motored (M) cars and two non-powered trailer (T) cars.

 The MoHa 205-600 cars are equipped with two PS33F single-arm pantographs.
 The KuHa 205-600 cars have a wheelchair-accessible toilet.

Interior
Passenger accommodation consists of longitudinal bench seating throughout. A universal access toilet was added to the KuHa 205-600 car at the time of conversion.

Iroha
In 2018, set Y3 was refurbished for Iroha Joyful Train services on the Nikko Line. Two doors were removed per car, and box seating and luggage racks were introduced.

Fleet list
Source:

205-1000 series (JR East)

The 205–1000 series of JR East operates as 2-car trainsets rebuilt from some former 205–0 series cars, which were used on the Nambu Branch Line since 2002, replacing the last standing cars of the aging train. 101 series until 2003.

205-1000 series (JR West)

The 205–1000 series of JR West was built into 4-car trainsets in 1988, they formerly operated in Hanwa Line services from March 1988 until they ended their operations in March 2018, and then they were transferred ahead to the Nara Line for local train services since 18 March 2018. Features include having a different windshield panel design, which is likely inverted their directions to avoid confusion of the pre-existing 205–0 series, which were formerly Tokaido Line Local Services in same blue stripe during that time.

205-1100 series

The 205–1100 series of JR East operates as 3-car trainsets rebuilt from former 205–0 series cars, which were introduced on the Tsurumi Line since August 2004, replacing the aging 103 series cars until their retirement in 2006.

205-1200 series

The 205–1200 series of JR East operates as six-car trainsets rebuilt from former 205–0 series cars, used on the Nambu Line services from 2004 until they were replaced by the new E233-8000 series trainsets until January 2016.

205-3000 series

The 205–3000 series are 4-car trainsets rebuilt from former 205–0 series cars, which were used on the Kawagoe Line and Hachiko Line from 2003 up until 2018.

Formation
From November 2003 until July 2018, five 4-car sets were allocated to Kawagoe Depot for use on Hachiko Line and Kawagoe Line through services. These sets were formed as follows with two motored ("M") cars and two non-powered trailer ("T") cars.

 Car 3 was originally fitted with a PS21 lozenge type pantograph, but they were converted into a PS33C single-arm type between April 2004 to February 2005.

205-3100 series

A Senseki Line 205–3100 series "Mangattan Liner" trainset (named after the Ishinomori Manga Museum, colloquially known as the Ishinomori Mangattan Museum) is decorated with images of the character Robocon from the 1970s tokusatsu series Ganbare!! Robocon, while another ("Mangattan Liner II") has Kamen Rider livery. Both were created by Shotaro Ishinomori, a native of Ishinomaki, Miyagi; Ishinomaki Station is the terminus of the Senseki Line.

Formations

4-car Senseki Line sets
As of April 2020, 17 4-car sets are allocated to Miyagino Depot for use on the Senseki Line. These sets are formed as follows with two motored ("M") cars and two non-powered trailer ("T") cars.

 The MoHa 205 car has two single-arm pantographs.

Gallery

205-5000 series

The 205–5000 series are fitted with two-level insulated gate bipolar transistor variable frequency drives as a traction system which produce a distinctive, high-pitched whine and it is one of the latest refurbished trains among 205-series which is specifically unique compared to the other refurbished 205 series classification which their former Yamanote Line 205–0 series cars were modified with new VVVF-controlled AC motors between 2002 and 2008, used on the Musashino Line & some parts of Keiyō Line to be scheduled for ending operations on the late 2020 prior to the acquisition all of these trainsets for overseas use to be shipped to Jakarta, Indonesia to be operated by Kereta Commuter Indonesia from 2018 to 2020.

Upon resale & overseas use, there are 288 vehicles (36 eight-car trainsets) for 205–5000 series withdrawn from the Musashino Line are scheduled to be shipped to Jakarta between March 2018 and 2020.

Formations

KAI Commuter sets
As of December 2020, four 8-car sets, six 10-car sets, and fifteen 12-car sets are allocated to Bukit Duri, Depok, and Klaten Depot for use on the Duri-Tangerang Line, Jakarta Kota-Bogor Line, Jatinegara-Bogor Line, Rangkasbitung Line, Jakarta Kota-Cikarang Line, and Yogyakarta Line through services. These sets are formed as follows with four motored ("M") cars and four non-powered ("T") cars.

The 8-car 205 series subsection 5000 without middle cabin formation is as follows.

The 10-car 205 series subsection 5000 with middle cabin formation is as follows.

The 10-car 205 series subsection 5000 without middle cabin formation is as follows.

The 12-car 205 series subsection 5000 with middle cabin formation is as follows.

The 12-car 205 series subsection 5000 without middle cabin formation is as follows.

 Cars 2 and 6 (for 8 car, 12 car, and some of the 10 car), 3 and 7 (for 10 car), and 10 (12 car) each have one lozenge-type pantograph.
 Car 4 is designated as a mildly air-conditioned car.

Gallery

Withdrawal and resale

Fuji Kyuko

A number of former 205 series trains were sold to Fuji Kyuko in 2011 and modified to become 3-car 6000 series sets, entering service from February 2012. Four more withdrawn JR East 205 series cars (KuHa 205-107 + MoHa 205-287 + MoHa 204-287 + KuHa 204–107) were resold to Fuji Kyuko following withdrawal in November 2016.

Indonesia
A total of 812 vehicles (102 sets) from withdrawn Saikyo Line, Yokohama Line, Nambu Line, and Musashino Line sets were exported to Kereta Commuter Indonesia in Jakarta between late 2013 up to October 2020. In Japan, the 205 series which were imported to Indonesia operates in the formation of 6, 8, or 10 trains. However, in Indonesia, the 205 series is rearranged so that it can be operated with a formation of 10 or 12 trains, so that only the series from the Saikyo line still uses its original formation when operating in Japan, while the series formations from the Yokohama, Nambu and Musashino lines are almost entirely is already no longer original.

Former Saikyo Line/Kawagoe Line/Rinkai Line sets
A total of 18 withdrawn Saikyo Line ten-car sets (180 vehicles) were shipped to Kereta Commuter Indonesia (KCI) in Jakarta, Indonesia, in 2013, and entered service from March 2014. The sets in use are former Kawagoe sets 1, 4, 7, 11 to 15, 18, 20, 22 to 26, and 30 to 32. All except sets 26, 30, and 32 include pairs of SaHa 204 cars with six pairs of doors per side. Sets 30 to 32 were originally Yamanote Line sets, distinguished by their smaller door windows. Set 23 was the first set to have a pair of LCD screens inside all cars, except SaHa 204 cars. Set 23 was also the first set to have working LED destination display in KuHa 204 and KuHa 205 cars. Set 15 and 32 were involved in a train accident in Juanda Station, Jakarta.

Former Yokohama Line sets
From July 2014, 22 withdrawn Yokohama Line eight-car sets, which in use are former trainset numbers 1, 2, 4, 6, 7 to 9; 11 to 15; 17 to 19; 21 to 25; and lastly 27 and 28, with a total of 176 vehicles were shipped to Jakarta and operated as 10-car or 12-car sets.

Former Nambu Line sets
In 2015, 20 withdrawn Nambu Line six-car sets (120 vehicles) were shipped to Jakarta. The former Nambu Line sets are used on 12-car operations.

Former Musashino Line sets
336 vehicles (36 trainsets for 205–5000 series & 6 trainsets for 205–0 series) withdrawn from the Musashino Line were shipped to Jakarta between March 2018 and December 2020. Sets are operated as 8, 10, and 12-car sets. The initial plan will see rearrangement of all sets into 12-car sets.

Notes

References

Further reading

External links

 JR East 205 series 

Electric multiple units of Japan
Hitachi multiple units
East Japan Railway Company
West Japan Railway Company
Kinki Sharyo multiple units
Kawasaki multiple units
Tokyu Car multiple units
Train-related introductions in 1985
Electric multiple units of Indonesia
Nippon Sharyo multiple units
1500 V DC multiple units of Japan